Karan Jotwani is an Indian actor. He is best known for his portrayal of Sahil Agarwal and Jackie in Aap Ke Aa Jane Se, Neelkanth Bhatt Dhyani in Qurbaan Hua, and Imtiaz Alqaazi in Bebaakee.

Early life
Jotwani was born on 12 September in Mumbai. He completed his graduation from H.R. College of Commerce and Economics, Mumbai.

Career
Karan began his acting career in 2013 in the television world when he was cast in Hindi television series Bade Achhe Lagte Hain as Mandeep Bobby Singh. In the same year, he appeared in the teen drama Confessions of an Indian Teenager and Gumrah: End of Innocence in episodic roles.

In 2014, he starred in the mystery drama Laut Aao Trisha as Vivan Swaika and the MTV teen drama Kaisi Yeh Yaariyan as Aryamaan Khurana. 

In 2016, he appeared in the episodic role of Yeh Hai Aashiqui as Ashish.   In the same year, he portrayed the recurring role of Sayyam on Star Plus soap opera Suhani Si Ek Ladki until the show ended in 2017.

In late 2017, he was cast on Zee TV's soap opera Aap Ke Aa Jane Se in the lead role of Sahil Agarwal. 

In May 2018, he appeared in an episode of Zee TV's talk show Juzzbaat as a guest with Adnan Khan and Arjit Taneja. 

In 2020, he joined the series Qurbaan Hua as Neel. In the same year, he joined the web series Bebaakee as a lead role alongside Kushal Tandon.

Filmography

Television

Special appearances

Web series

Music videos

Awards and nominations

References

External links

21st-century Indian male actors
Living people
Punjabi people
Sindhi people
Indian male television actors
Male actors in Hindi television
1991 births
Indian male models
Male actors from Punjab, India
People from Jalandhar